Coors Cutter was a non-alcoholic beverage from Coors Brewing Company. It was introduced in 1991 with the formula revamped in 1994. It is still available in some markets.

References 

Non-alcoholic drinks
Discontinued products